Makhosazana Masongo (born 13 September 2000), professionally known as Azana is a South African singer and songwriter. Born and raised in Chesterville, her musical career began at the age of 15. Having signed a record deal with Big City Dreams, Azana's debut studio album Ingoma (2020), debuted number one in South Africa. Its lead single "Your Love" was certified double platinum by the Recording Industry of South Africa (RiSA).

Career 
Her breakthrough single "Your Love" was released in May 2020, produced by Taffy Da Don. The song was commercial success certified double platinum by the Recording industry of South Africa (RiSA).

Her debut studio album Ingoma was released on 17 July 2020. The album peaked at number 1 on Apple Music Pop Chart. It features Afriikan Papi, Disciples of House, and Sun-El Musician.

At the 27th ceremony of South African Music Awards Ingoma was nominated for Best Afro Pop Album and Newcomer of the Year.

In early April 2020, Azana was featured on "Uhuru" a single by the South African DJ Sun-El Musician.

She made collaboration on Platoon's compilation album African Lullabies Part 1, in October 2021.

Azana's single "Higher" was released on 3 December 2021.

Discography

Studio albums 
 Ingoma (2020)
 TBA  (2023)

As lead artist

References 

South African women singer-songwriters
2000 births
Living people
21st-century South African women singers